"Still In Love With You" is the second single from the international album Everything I Am by Greek singer Anna Vissi, which was released in early January 2001. This single featured the song "Still In Love With You", which became a hit in many European countries, especially the Netherlands. It was released in the United States on March 12, 2001.

Track listing
"Still In Love With You" (Radio Edit)
"Still In Love With You" (Soda Club Radio Mix)
"Still In Love With You" (Soda Club Mix)
"Still In Love With You" (Soda Club TV track)

Charts

References

External links
Anna Vissi Official Website

2001 singles
Anna Vissi songs
Songs written by Graham Stack (record producer)
English-language Greek songs
Songs written by Mark Taylor (record producer)
2001 songs
Songs written by Paul Barry (songwriter)